The Budureasa mine is a large mine in the northwest of Romania in Bihor County,  southeast of Oradea and  north of the capital, Bucharest. Budureasa represents the largest magnesium reserve in Romania and the largest in Europe having estimated reserves of 40 million tonnes of ore grading 30% magnesium.

References 

Brucite mines in Romania